This is a list of hiking trails in the U.S. state of Maine.

By county

Androscoggin County
 Androscoggin Riverlands State Park - Cross-country Ski Trails, ; Turner
 Androscoggin Riverlands State Park - Hiking Trails, ; Turner
 Androscoggin Riverlands State Park - Mountain Biking Trails, ; Turner
 Androscoggin Riverlands State Park - Snowshoe Trails, ; Turner
 Barker Mill Trail, ; Auburn
 Beaver Park, ; Lisbon
 Corn Shop Trail, ; Turner
 Curtis Homestead, ; Leeds
 David Rancourt River Preserve, ; Lewiston
 Durham River Park, ; Durham
 ELF Woods Trails, ; Auburn
 Foundry Trail, ; Livermore Falls
 Franklin Pasture Trail, ; Lewiston
 Garcelon Bog, ; Lewiston
 Lake Auburn Community Center, ; Auburn
 Leavitt Area High School, ; Turner
 Lewiston-Auburn Greenway Trails, ; Lewiston and Auburn
 Minot Community Trails, ; Minot
 Monument Hill, ; Leeds
 Mount Apatite, ; Auburn
 Mount David, ; Lewiston
 Paper Mill Trail, ; Lisbon
 Pettingill Park Trail, ; Auburn
 Poland Spring Preservation Park, ; Poland
 Poland Town Forest and Bragdon Hill, ; Poland
 Railroad Trail, ; Poland
 Range Ponds State Park, ; Poland
 Range Ponds State Park - Mountain Bike Trails, ; Poland
 Runaround Pond Recreation Area, ; Durham
 Sherwood Forest Conservation Area, ; Auburn
 Spring Road Trail, ; Auburn
 Summer Street Park, ; Lisbon
 Thorncrag Nature Sanctuary, ; Lewiston
 Union Street Greenway, ; Auburn
 Washburn-Norlands Living History Center, ; Livermore

Aroostook County
 Aroostook National Wildlife Refuge-West Gate Trails; ; Caribou and Limestone
 Aroostook National Wildlife Refuge--Visitor Center Trails; ; Caswell and Caribou
 America's First Mile Trail, ; Fort Kent
 Fort Kent Riverside Trails, ; Fort Kent
 Hedgehog Mountain Trail, ; Winterville
 Nordic Heritage Center--Single Track Network, ; Fort Fairfield and Presque Isle 
 Island Trail, ; Fort Kent
 Snowy Mountain Trails, ; Stockholm
 Split Cedar Trails, ; Van Buren

Cumberland County
 Androscoggin Riverwalk, ; Brunswick and Topsham
 Arnold Family Forest, Blair Addition, ; Freeport
 Bliss Woods, ; Freeport
 Bradbury Mountain State Park - Hiking Trails, ; Pownal
 Bradbury Mountain State Park - Mountain Biking Trails, ; Pownal
 Calderwood Trails, ; Freeport
 Captain Alfred Skolfield Preserve, ; Brunswick
 Chandler Brook Preserve, ; North Yarmouth
 Cousins River Trail, ; Freeport
 Crystal Spring Farm, ; Brunswick
 Deer Hollow Sanctuary, ; Windham
 Donnabeth Lipman Park, ; Windham
 Intervale Preserve, ; New Gloucester
 Jugtown Forest, ; Casco, Naples, and Otisfield
 Libby Hill Forest, ; Gray
 Mast Landing Audubon Sanctuary, ; Freeport
 Mayberry Hill Preserve, ; Casco
 Old Town House Park, ; North Yarmouth
 Pineland Public Reserved Land, ; Gray, New Gloucester, and North Yarmouth
 Pisgah Hill Summit Trail, ; New Gloucester
 Pratt's Brook Park, ; Yarmouth
 Raymond Elementary, ; Raymond
 Royal River Park & Beth Condon Pathway, ; Yarmouth
 Sam Ristich Trail Network, ; North Yarmouth
 Skolfield Shores Preserve, ; Harpswell
 West Side Trail, ; Yarmouth
 Wolfe's Neck Woods State Park, ; Freeport

Franklin County
 Bald Mountain Trail, ; South Franklin
 Blueberry Mountain Trail ; Township 6 North of Weld
 Bonney Woods, ; Farmington
 Clifford Woods, ; Farmington
 Daggett Rock Trail, ; Phillips
 Jay Recreation Area Trail System, ; Jay
 Rangeley Lake State Park ; Rangeley
 Whistle Stop Trail, ; Farmington, Wilton, and Jay

Hancock County
 Bar Harbor Shore Path, ; Bar Harbor
 Ellsworth Trail, ; Ellsworth
 Kittredge Brook Forest, ; Bar Harbor
 Old Pond Railway Trail, ; Hancock
 Trenton Community Trail, ; Trenton

Kennebec County
 Allen-Whitney Memorial Forest, ; Manchester
 Augusta Nature Education Center, ; Augusta
 Davidson Nature Preserve, ; Vassalboro
 Gannett Woods and Wyman Memorial Forest, ; Manchester and Readfield
 Gott Pasture Preserve, ; Wayne
 Holman Conservation Area, ; Litchfield
 Jamies Pond, ; Farmingdale, Hallowell, and Manchester
 Kennebec River Rail Trail, ; Augusta, Farmingdale, Gardiner, and Hallowell
 Macdonald Conservation Area & Readfield Town Farm Forest, ; Readfield and Wayne
 Old Narrow Gauge Rail Trail, ; Randolph
 Perkins Woods, ; Wayne
 Readfield Fairgrounds, ; Readfield
 Small-Burnham Conservation Area, ; Litchfield
 Smithfield Plantation, ; Litchfield
 Torsey Pond Nature Preserve and Echo Lake Watershed Preserve, ; Readfield
 Tyler Conservation Area, ; Readfield
 University of Maine Augusta Fitness Trails, ; Augusta
 Viles Arboretum, ; Augusta
 Woodbury Nature Conservancy, ; Litchfield and Monmouth

Knox County
  Camden Hills State Park, ; Camden

Lincoln County
 Pownalborough Court House Trails, ; Dresden

Oxford County
 Jugtown Forest, ; Casco, Naples, and Otisfield
 Maggie's Nature Park, ; Greenwood
 Ordway Grove Trail, ; Norway
 Packard Trail, ; Buckfield
 Riverside and Viking Trails, ; Norway and Paris
 Roberts Farm Preserve, ; Norway
 Sebago Lake State Park - Campground, ; Naples
 Sebago Lake State Park - Day Use Area, ; Casco
 Shepard's Farm Family Preserve, ; Norway
 Streaked Mountain Trail, ; Buckfield, Hebron, and Paris
 Whitney Brook Trail, ; Canton
 Witt Swamp Trail, ; Norway

Penobscot County
 Kenduskeag Stream Trail, Bangor 
 Sunkhaze Meadows National Wildlife Refuge, Milford

Piscataquis County
Borestone Mountain, ; Elliotsville Township
Mount Kineo State Park, ; Kineo Township
Peaks-Kenny State Park, ; Bowerbank, Dover-Foxcroft

Sagadahoc County
 Androscoggin Riverwalk, ; Brunswick and Topsham
 Beatrice B. Baxter Memorial Forest, ; Topsham
 Bradley Pond Farm Preserve, ; Topsham
 Cathance River Nature Preserve, ; Topsham
 Cathance River Trail, ; Topsham
 Foreside Trails, ; Topsham
 Merrymeeting Fields Preserve, ; Woolwich
 Ravine Trails, ; Topsham
 Swan Island, ; Perkins Township
 Thorne Head Preserve, ; Bath 
 Transfer Station Trails, ; Topsham
 Whiskeag Trail, ; Bath

Somerset County
 Good Will-Hinckley, ; Fairfield
 Historic Pines Trail, ; Madison
 Lake George Regional Park, ; Canaan and Skowhegan
 Robbins Hill-Wes Baker Trails. ; Solon
 Skowhegan Bog Trail. ; Skowhegan

Waldo County
 Fort Point State Park, ; Stockton Springs
 Haystack Mountain Trail, ; Liberty and Montville
 Moose Point State Park, ; Searsport

Washington County
 Calais Walkway, Calais
 Quoddy Head State Park,  Lubec

York County
 Alewive Woods Preserve, ; Kennebunk
 Sanford-Springvale Rail Trail, ; Sanford

See also
 List of hiking trails in the United States

References

Lists of hiking trails in the United States
L
hiking trails
hiking trails